ART (Asti Radio Television) is a Greek private free-to-air informative television station of regional scope, broadcasting in Attica.

History
The station began with test broadcasts on February 14, 1990 under the name TeleCity and a month later with its full schedule. In 2001, it was renamed TeleAsty (Greek translation of TeleCity).

Almost from its inception until 2010, the channel illegally extended its reach nationwide, through repeaters, having an analog broadcast in many parts of Greece.

In 2018, the channel broadcast digitally terrestrially in Cyprus as well, while in previous years it had a collaboration with the Cypriot channel Extra TV of Limassol.

Later, the Greek National Council for Radio and Television, the Hellenic Telecommunications and Post Commission, as well as the corresponding Cypriot authorities, stopped these broadcasts because the station had a license to broadcast only for Attica.

In 2012, TeleAsty got its current name (ART). In 2013, the channel automatically acquired a nationwide license by law, a decision which the opposition parties at the time reacted to. Finally, ART covered the entire territory through Digea from June 27, 2014.

Program
Includes informative shows, shows about the Popular Orthodox Rally that supports the channel, documentaries and the music show Style GR which is one of the longest running shows on Greek television with video clips of Greek and foreign songs, both new and older from the decade of 1980s and 1990s. It also featured telemarketing.

Licenses
On September 10, 1993, the operation of the channel was legalized based on the 19230/E license of local scope in the region of Attica. However, the station has since its inception illegally extended its reach nationwide. Since the middle of 2013, it was considered as a nationwide station.

In the competition for nationwide licenses in July 2016, ART TV, together with the then Epsilon TV (today's Open TV), Makedonia TV, and Mega Channel, were excluded from the competition process for formal and financial reasons.

On April 1, 2018, ART TV was finally obliged by the broadcasting law to broadcast only in Attica, Argosaronikos, Central and Southern Evia and a part of the Cyclades.

References

External links

Greek-language television stations
Television channels and stations established in 1990
Television networks in Greece
1990 establishments in Greece
Television channels in Greece